Audacieuse was an  of the French Navy.

Career 
Audacieuse served between France and the Far East, notable ferrying ambassador Jean-Baptiste Louis Gros to China in 1857 and bringing guns from the Taku Forts to France.

Legacy 
The Musée national de la Marine in Paris has a model of Audacieuse on display.

Sources and references

Bibliography

References 

Age of Sail frigates of France
Ardente class frigates
Ships built in France
1856 ships